Bughotu (also spelled Bugotu) is an Oceanic language spoken in the Solomon Islands. Its speakers live on Santa Isabel Island and on the small neighboring Furona Island.

References

External links
Paradisec houses two collections of Arthur Capell's materials that include Boiken (AC1 and AC2) as well as a recording in the Malcolm Ross collection (MR1). All of these collections are open access.
Na Tarai Nidia Mara Na Tano Ma Na Mavitu Nagogna na Vanatabu Form of Preparation of Priest and Server at the Foot of the Altar in Bugotu (1951)
Old Testament portions in the Bugotu language (1905)

Southeast Solomonic languages
Languages of the Solomon Islands